The Conțeasca is a right tributary of the river Siret in Romania. It discharges into the Siret near Hârtoape.

References

Rivers of Romania
Rivers of Iași County